Township 3 is a township in Harper County, Kansas, United States.  As of the 2010 census, the population is 300.

History
The township was officially designated "Township Number 3" until late 2007, when "Number" was dropped.

Geography

References

Townships in Harper County, Kansas
Townships in Kansas